
Fang is the 47th most prevalent Chinese surname. In Chinese, Fāng means "square" or "four-sided". Fāng is pronounced Fong in Cantonese, Hong or Png or Pwee in some Min Nan dialects and Png or Pung in Teochew.  It is the 56th name on the Hundred Family Surnames poem. 

Some more uncommon surnames with romanizations that are also conventionally simplified to "Fang" in English are Fáng, meaning "room", and Fāng, meaning "fragrant".

Etymology
During Emperor Huang Di's reign, a descendant called Yu Lei was awarded the land of Fang (north west of Nanyu) for his contributions in defeating a foreign tribe. He was thus known as Fang Lei, and his descendants were given the family name Fang.

Ji Yuan is considered as another forefather of the Fangs. Ji was a general of Zhou Xuan Wang, and was known for his contributions in conquering the north and the south. Since his nickname was Fang Shu, the king awarded him the family name of Fang.

People with the surname

Unspecified
Forrest Fang (born 1959), American composer of Chinese descent
Frank F. Fang, (born 1930), Chinese-American physicist

方 (Fāng)

Fang (alchemist) (fl. 1st century B.C.), Chinese woman alchemist
Fang Bao, mid-Ming dynasty era poet
Fang Bin, Chinese journalist and whistleblower
Fang Binxing, Chinese computer scientist and politician
Fang Chengguo, Chinese businessperson
Fang Chieh-min, Taiwanese badminton player
Fang Chih, Chinese diplomat
Fang Congyi, Chinese painter
Fang Dan, Chinese figure skater
Fang Fang, Chinese writer
Fang Guancheng, Qing dynasty noble and government official
Fang Hui, Song Dynasty scholar
Fang Jing, Chinese television journalist and anchor
Fang Jing De, Chinese American editor
Fang La, Song Dynasty revolutionary leader
Fang Lijun, Chinese artist
Fang Liufang, Chinese lawyer
Fang Lizhi (1936–2012), Chinese astrophysicist and political activist
Fang Man (composer), American composer of Chinese descent
Fang Quan (d. 1897), Qing Empire Mandarin
Fang Shengdong, Chinese revolutionary
Fang Shu (born 1957), Chinese film actress
Fang Shuo (born 1990), Chinese basketball player
Fang Weiyi (1585–1668), Chinese poet, calligrapher, painter and literature historian
Fang Xianjue, Chinese general
Fāng Xìaorú (1357–1402), Ming dynasty Confucian scholar
Fang Xingdong, Chinese Internet entrepreneur and free-speech activist
Fang Yanqiao, Chinese swimmer
Fang Yingchao, Chinese volleyball player
Fang Yuting, Chinese archer
Fang Zhaoling, Chinese painter and calligrapher
Fang Zheng, Chinese Political Activist
Fang Zhenwu, Chinese military officer
Fang Zhimin, Chinese military and political leader
Achilles Fang, American sinologist and comparatist of Chinese descent
Florence Fang (born 1933/1934), American businesswoman, publisher and philanthropist
Harry Fang, Hongkongnese orthopedic surgeon and politician
Ian Fang, Chinese actor in Singapore
Khalil Fong, Hongkongnese singer and songwriter
Ivan Png, Singaporean economist and professor
Pierre Png, Singaporean actor and comedian
Png Eng Huat, Singaporean politician and businessman
Thomé H. Fang, Taiwanese philosopher
Vincent Fang (entrepreneur), Hongkongnese businessperson and politician
Vincent Fang (lyricist), Taiwanese lyricist
Wai-Chi Fang, Taiwanese engineer
Wen-Pei Fang, Chinese botanist

房 (Fáng)
Fang Guan, Tang Dynasty official
Fang Rong, Zhou Dynasty official
Fang Xuanling (579–648), Tang Dynasty official
Jackie Chan, Hongkongnese actor; family renamed "Chan" following the World War II
Serena Fang, Taiwanese actress and model

See also
Fong (disambiguation)

References

External links
"Fang" family history

Chinese-language surnames
Multiple Chinese surnames

de:Fong